The 2020 La Tropicale Amissa Bongo was a road cycling stage race that took place in Gabon and Cameroon between 20 and 26 January 2020. The race was rated as a 2.1 event as part of the 2020 UCI Africa Tour, and was the 15th edition of La Tropicale Amissa Bongo.

Teams
Fifteen teams were invited to the race, of which one was a UCI WorldTeam, two were UCI Professional Continental teams, four were UCI Continental teams, and eight were national teams. Each team entered six riders into the race for a total of 90 riders, of which 72 finished the race.

UCI WorldTeams

 

UCI Professional Continental Teams

 
 

UCI Continental Teams

 
 
 
 

National Teams

 Algeria
 Burkina Faso
 Cameroon
 Eritrea
 Gabon
 Ivory Coast
 Morocco
 Rwanda

Route

Stages

Stage 1
20 January 2020 — Bitam to Ebolowa (Cameroon),

Stage 2 
21 January 2020 — Bitam to Oyem,

Stage 3 
22 January 2020 — Mitzic to Ndjolé,

Stage 4 
23 January 2020 — Lambaréné to Mouila,

Stage 5 
24 January 2020 — Lambaréné to Bifoun,

Stage 6 
25 January 2020 — Port-Gentil to Port-Gentil,

Stage 7 
26 January 2020 — Nkok to Libreville,

Classification leadership table

Final classification standings

General classification

Points classification

Mountains classification

Young rider classification

Sprints classification

Teams classification

References

External links

2020
2020 UCI Africa Tour
2020 in Gabonese sport
2020 in Cameroonian sport